Piyush Khakhar (born 22 October 1965) is an Indian former first-class cricketer. He is now an umpire and has stood in matches in the Ranji Trophy.

References

External links
 

1965 births
Living people
Indian cricketers
Indian cricket umpires
Saurashtra cricketers
People from Rajkot